Coyoles Airport  is an airport serving the town of Coyoles in Yoro Department, Honduras.

There are buildings within  of the runway on the east end.

See also

 Transport in Honduras
 List of airports in Honduras

References

External links
 FallingRain - Coyoles
 HERE Maps - Coyoles
 OpenStreetMap - Coyoles
 OurAirports - Coyoles
 

Airports in Honduras